The Total Experience Gospel Choir was a gospel music group based in Seattle, Washington, United States, founded in 1973 by Pastor Patrinell Staten "Pat" Wright, who led the group until its dissolution in 2018. They have sung in at least 38 states and 22 countries, have performed for United States presidents Bill Clinton, Barack Obama, at the funeral of Jimi Hendrix in 1970, and made at least seven recordings of their own, as well as singing behind Barry Manilow at KeyArena in 2015, and on the song "Save Me" on Dave Matthews's CD Some Devil. They have appeared in television commercials ("to pay our bills") and on the public radio program A Prairie Home Companion as well as numerous other radio programs.

Founding 
Patrinell Wright was born in Carthage, Texas. Her father was a Baptist preacher and her mother a schoolteacher. She sang her first solo at the age of 3 and was directing two choirs in her father's church by her 14th birthday. She graduated as valedictorian from Turner High School in Carthage, Prairie View A&M University in Hempstead, Texas and moved in 1964 to Seattle. She has had an extensive musical career in her own right, and since 1997 has been pastor of the Oneness Christian Center in Seattle, which she co-founded. Wright began the group in 1973 as a gospel music class at Seattle's public Franklin High School.

Pastor Wright has earned the nickname "The Idol Breeder" and has become once again uniquely distinguished after three of her choir members became finalists on the television series American Idol.  Among its former members are American Idol contestant Sanjaya Malakar in 2007, 2004 contestant Leah LaBelle Vladowski, and 2002 contestant Karma Johnson.

Patrinell Wright died on August 30th, 2022 at the age of 78 after a long illness.

Until 1992–93, the choir was composed primarily of African-American youth. Since that time, the choir's membership evolved, bearing members from 6 to 65 years of age.

History 
Since Hurricane Katrina hit the Gulf Coast Areas of Louisiana and Mississippi in August 2005, Pastor Wright dedicated many hours for hurricane relief work.  One of her own teenage choir members and her younger brother were caught up in the hurricane while in South Mississippi visiting family. Upon their safe return to Seattle, Pastor Wright and the Total Experience Gospel Choir devoted themselves tirelessly to hurricane relief. They visited the areas in August 2006, April 2007, March 2008, August 2008 and August 2015 helping to rebuild lives and property. While there, they were featured on local television a number of times rebuilding, dedicating and celebrating with hurricane survivors during the various mission trips.

For Pastor Wright's efforts, ABC News World News Tonight named her "Person of the Week" in May 2007 as well as one of the "Persons of the Year" on a broadcast aired December 27, 2007.

DirectTV on April 9, 2008 aired their special entitled "Hometown Heroes" where Pastor Wright and Total Experience Gospel Choir were honored for their work on the Gulf Coast of MS as well.

SCAN TV honored Pastor Wright in February 2008 on local television in their Black History programming where she, along with other local community members, were lauded for their contributions to Black History in the Pacific Northwest.

In October 2007, Pastor Wright and members of Total Experience Gospel Choir traveled to Busan, South Korea, where they competed in the Busan International Choral Festival and Competition.  The choir placed "second" and won the Silver Medal in "Ethnic" and "Pop" categories.  There were 36 choirs from 11 countries in the competition.

In 2008, Pastor Wright and Total Experience Gospel Choir participated in the creation of the first of its kind "campaign CD" in an effort to help elect President Barack Obama. The CD "Seven Songs for America and One For The World" was produced by The Bergevin Brothers. All profits from "Seven Songs For America..." go to support Pastor Wright's "Seattle Artists" foundation to rebuild the lives and homes of Katrina victims in Mississippi and Louisiana.

During 2014, The Total Experience Gospel Choir performed "Highway to Heaven" with the Heart Band at the Benayra Hall in Seattle and Victoria, British Columbia as well as many other Washington state locations.  Pastor Pat Wright was asked to tour around the United States with Heart to teach the various choirs that accompanied them in each city.

On May 27, 2015 in Seattle at KeyArena on May 27, Pastor Wright and the Total Experience Gospel Choir performed on stage with Barry Manilow on his ONE LAST TIME concert! They sang the background for "Copacabana", "I Write the Songs" and "Miracle".

In July 2015 Pastor Wright took the choir down to New Orleans for the ten-year anniversary of Hurricane Katrina, working alongside Randy Novak of "Shirts Across America", the choir helped renovate St. Jude Community Center and performed in various locations such as St. Augustine Catholic Church and anywhere there was a need to lift the spirits of the locals.

During a fundraising trip to Seattle in October 2015, Pastor Wright and a select few of the choir members sang for President Obama at the Westin Hotel.

In 2018, the choir celebrated its 45th anniversary with a free concert at the Moore Theatre and the release of a documentary, Patrinell: The Total Experience, detailing Wright's life and the history of the choir. After that, Wright stepped down from her position as director and the choir was disbanded.

References

External links

 Official site.
 Total Experience Gospel Choir, Seattle Times. 15 photos from the choir's tour of the post-Hurricane Katrina Gulf Coast.
 , WLOX, Mississippi Gulf Coast, ABC Affiliate
 , WLOX, Mississippi Gulf Coast, ABC Affiliate
 Barack Obama and Joe Biden: The Change We Need | Bergevin Brothers's Blog: Offering to play the inauguration., Helping elect President Obama

American gospel musical groups
Culture of Seattle
Musical groups from Seattle
Musical groups established in 1973